FC Prishtina, officially known as Mabetex Prishtina due to sponsorship reasons, is a professional futsal club based in Prishtina, Kosovo. The club play in the Futsal Superleague of Kosovo, which is the top tier of football in the country.

Players

Current squad

Prishtina in Europe
FC Prishtina will compete in the UEFA Futsal Champions League for the first time in the 2020–21 season, entering at the preliminary round. On 21 October 2020, the draw was held and Prishtina were drawn against the Albanian side Tirana. On 25 November 2020, Prishtina beat Tirana at Palace of Youth and Sports in Prishtina, this victory secured the qualification for the round of 32, where faced with the Spanish giants Barcelona, who defeated Fc Prishtina with a result of 9–2.

References

Sports teams in Kosovo
Futsal clubs established in 2015
2015 establishments in Kosovo